Brahmavar is a taluk in Udupi district located on NH 66 (formerly NH 17),  north of the Udupi in Karnataka, India.

Location
The Suvarna and Sita Rivers, originating in Western Ghats, form backwaters around Brahmavara before joining the Arabian Sea near Hangarkatte.

Brahmavara is surrounded by several villages, including Handadi, Baikady, Pethri, Kunjal, Kumragod, Salikeri, Haradi and Matapadi. Barkur is to the north of Brahmavara, and the temple city Udupi to its south.

References

External links

Rotary Brahmavar International
Saint Mary's Syrian PU College

Cities and towns in Udupi district